Rush is a town in Monroe County, New York, United States. The population was 3,478 at the 2010 census.

The Town of Rush is a suburb of Rochester located in the southern part of the county.

History
The Town of Rush was established in 1818 from the town of Avon in what was then Genesee County. It was either named after the rushes growing along the creek, or after Dr. Benjamin Rush, a Founding Father of the United States.

Geography
The south and west town lines are the border of Livingston County. The north borders the town of Henrietta. The west borders the town of Wheatland, and the east borders the town of Mendon. Interstate 390 passes through the town.

Honeoye Creek passes through the center of town and has been prone to flooding in recent years. The Lehigh Valley trail follows the creek along the former Lehigh Valley railroad line and extends to the Genesee River.

Demographics

As of the census of 2000, there were 3,603 people, 1,268 households, and 995 families residing in the town.  The population density was 118.1 people per square mile (45.6/km2).  There were 1,300 housing units at an average density of 42.6 per square mile (16.5/km2).  The racial makeup of the town was 92.62% White, 4.94% African American, 0.36% Native American, 0.83% Asian, 0.44% from other races, and 0.80% from two or more races. Hispanic or Latino of any race were 1.97% of the population.

There were 1,268 households, out of which 32.3% had children under the age of 18 living with them, 68.8% were married couples living together, 6.4% had a female householder with no husband present, and 21.5% were non-families. 15.9% of all households were made up of individuals, and 5.9% had someone living alone who was 65 years of age or older.  The average household size was 2.62 and the average family size was 2.94.

In the town, the population was spread out, with 29.3% under the age of 18, 4.3% from 18 to 24, 26.9% from 25 to 44, 28.4% from 45 to 64, and 11.0% who were 65 years of age or older.  The median age was 39 years. For every 100 females, there were 119.6 males.  For every 100 females age 18 and over, there were 100.0 males.

The median income for a household in the town was $67,632, and the median income for a family was $73,269. Males had a median income of $48,802 versus $39,357 for females. The per capita income for the town was $27,174.  About 0.8% of families and 0.5% of the population were below the poverty line, including 0.5% of those under age 18 and none of those age 65 or over.

Arts and culture

Tourism
The Rochester & Genesee Valley Railroad Museum on NY 251 in Industry preserves local railroad heritage and is connected by a very short-line railroad to the New York Museum of Transportation around the corner on East River Road.

The Lehigh Valley Trail, an east-west trail following Honeoye Creek in the bed of the former Lehigh Valley Railroad, is a popular walking trail in the summer and cross country skiing trail in the winter. (Motorized vehicles are prohibited.)

Rush Veteran's Memorial Park is a popular fishing spot, above and below the falls.

The Rush Creekside Inn was built on the site of the former Rush Hotel, which burned down in 1981.

Government

The town is governed by a Town Supervisor and four councilpersons, all elected by registered town voters.

Education

Primary and secondary schools
Public schools in Rush are under the jurisdiction of the Rush-Henrietta Central School District. The district has five elementary schools, two middle schools, a ninth grade academy, and one high school, Rush–Henrietta Senior High School. The district also has an alternative education program. Public schools in the area are also under the jurisdiction of Honeoye Falls-Lima Central School District and Avon Central Schools District.

Public libraries
The Rush Public Library has been in operation since 1914.

Notable people

 George Coe, 11th Lieutenant Governor of Michigan.
 Mary Galentine Fenner (1839-1903), poet and litterateur
 Gary Lewis, singer, resident of Rush

Communities and locations in the Town of Rush
Five Points – A hamlet in the southwest part of the town.
Golah – A hamlet in the west part of the town.
Industry – A hamlet west of North Rush on Route 251.
Manns Corner –  A hamlet east of North Rush on Route 251.
Meadow Wood –  A hamlet in the southwest part of the town.
North Rush – A hamlet in the northwest part of the town on Route 251.
Rush – The hamlet of Rush in the northeast part of the town.
West Rush – A hamlet in the western part of the town, west of the interstate.

References

External links

 Information about Rush

	

Rochester metropolitan area, New York
Towns in Monroe County, New York
1818 establishments in New York (state)
Populated places established in 1818